Murakayevo (Moraqay) is a rural locality (a village) in Baimovsky Selsoviet, Abzelilovsky District, Bashkortostan, Russia. The population was 329 as of 2010. There are 7 streets.

Geography 
Murakayevo is located 73 km north of Askarovo (the district's administrative centre) by road. Novobalapanovo is the nearest rural locality.

References 

Rural localities in Abzelilovsky District